Bullseye or Bull's Eye  may refer to:

Symbols
 ◎ (Unicode U+25CE BULLSEYE), in the Geometric Shapes Unicode block
 (Unicode U+0298 LATIN LETTER BILABIAL CLICK), the phonetic symbol for bilabial click

Animals and plants 
 Bull's Eye, Euryops chrysanthemoides, a shrub
 Bullseye cardinalfish (disambiguation)
 Bullseye coral, Caulastrea furcata
 Bullseye catfish, Horabagrus
 Bullseye electric ray, Diplobatis ommata, a fish
 Bullseye lichen, Placopsis, a fungus
 Bullseye puffer, Sphoeroides annulatus, a fish
 Bullseye round stingray, Urobatis concentricus, a fish
 Bullseye snakehead, Channa marulius, a fish
 Bullseye wriggler, Xenisthmus polyzonatus, a fish
 Longfinned bullseye or deepwater bullseye, Cookeolus japonicus, a fish
 Moontail bullseye, Priacanthus hamrur, a fish
 Shrubby bullseye, Gochnatia hypoleuca, a sunflower

Architecture

Bullseye, an alternative name for crown glass (window)
Bull's eye, an oculus
 , (French, 'bull's eye'), a small oval window

Arts, entertainment, and media

Fictional entities 
Bullseye (character), an enemy of Daredevil in the Marvel Comics universe
Bullseye (mascot), dog mascot of Target Corporation, which uses a bullseye symbol as its logo
Bullseye, a Toy Story  character
Bull's Eye, a dog owned by Bill Sikes in Oliver Twist by Charles Dickens

Film 
Bull's Eye (serial), a 1917 American film serial
Bullseye (1987 film), Australian movie
Bullseye! (1990 film), a British comedy movie

Music
Bull's Eye! (album), a 1968 album by Barry Harris
"Bullseye", a song by Aly & AJ from Insomniatic, 2007
"Bull's Eye", a song by Nano, 2015

Television
Bullseye (1980 American game show), hosted by Jim Lange (1980–1982)
Bullseye (2015 American game show), hosted by Kellan Lutz and Godfrey
Bullseye (British game show), hosted by Jim Bowen (1981–1995), Dave Spikey (2006) and Alan Carr (2020-2021)
Bullseye (American TV program), American news program (2003–2005)
"Bullseye" (American Horror Story), a 2014 episode 
"Bullseye" (The Avengers), a 1962 episode
 "Bullseye", a 2010 episode of Law & Order: Special Victims Unit (season 12)
 "Bullseye", pricing games from The Price Is Right
 "Bullseye!", an episode of season 3 of Phineas and Ferb
Bullseye game, part of Family Feud TV game show
Hugh S. "Bullseye" Forward, a character from COPS (animated TV series)
Sapul sa Singko, formerly Sapul (English: 'Bullseye'), a Philippines TV show

Other uses in arts and entertainment
Bullseye with Jesse Thorn, an American public radio program and podcast
Bullseye guitar, used by Eddie Ojeda
 Bull's Eyes, a 1961 story of Railway Series book "Branch Line Engines"
 Bullseye: Western Scout, a Mainline Publications comic

Businesses and organisations
 Bullseye Glass, an American company
 Target Bullseye, the Target Corporation logo

Places
 Bullseye Lake, Victoria Land, Antarctica
 Bullseye Mountain, Queen Elizabeth Range, Antarctica

Ships
 Bull's eye, or deadeye, in sailing ship rigging
 Bull's-eye, a porthole window in a ship
 Herreshoff Bull's Eye, an American sailboat design

Sports and games
Bullseye (target), or bull's-eye, the centre of a target
 Bullseyes-Tokyo, an American football team from Japan
 Bull's-Eye Ball, a skee ball game

Other uses 
 Bull's Eye (postage stamp), an 1843 Brazilian stamp
 Bull's Eye, or Caramel Cream, a sweet by Goetze's Candy Company
 Bulls-eye (sweet), a spherical humbug
 Bull's-Eye Barbecue Sauce
 Bull's eye egg, sometimes meaning:
Fried egg, in India and Indonesia
Poached egg, in India
 Bullseye, a type of barcode
 Bullseye, a daily lottery game in Lotto New Zealand
Bullseye, the centre of a MaxiCode
 Bullseye, a slang terms for money
 Bullseye, or socked on the nose, a centred postmark in philately
 Bullseye, a swirled pattern on a tabby cat
 Bullseye rash, Erythema chronicum migrans, often seen in the early stage of Lyme disease
 Bullseye, the codename of version 11 of the Debian Linux operating system

See also 

Double Bullseye (disambiguation)
Fisheye (disambiguation)
Oxeye (disambiguation)
Bull's eye level, a type of spirit level
 Bull's Eye Shooter Supply, a store implicated in the 2002 D.C. sniper attacks
Chloroquine retinopathy, also known as Bull's eye maculopathy
Circled dot (disambiguation)
Fresnel lens